This is a list of cricketers who have played cricket for the Railways Cricket Association.

A

 Ashish Verma (born 1998)
 Habib Ahmed (1939–1993)
 Hyder Ali (born 1943)
 Raja Ali (1976–2012)
 Sabir Ali (born 1981)
 Lala Amarnath
 Pravin Amre (born 1968)
 Mohammad Aslam (born 1975)
 Prashant Awasthi (born 1990)

B

 Sanjay Bangar (born 1972)
 Deepak Bansal (born 1990)
 Krishnamachari Bharatan (born 1963)
 Saket Bhatia (born 1978)
 Kamal Bhattacharjee (born 1936)
 Nitin Bhille (born 1989)
 Rohan Bhosale (born 1988)
 Rajesh Borah (born 1967)
 Sivaji Bose (born 1925)
 Alfred Burrows (1952–2015)

Bharat sevak (1964 born)

C

 Samir Chakrabarti (1943–2015)
 Rabindra Chanda (born 1932)
 V. Cheluvaraj (born 1986)
 Nari Contractor (born 1934)

D

 Mrunal Devdhar (born 1992)
 Vinit Dhulap (born 1989)

F

 Farsatullah (born 1954)
 Faiz Fazal (born 1985)

G

 Shailender Gehlot (born 1984)
 Arindam Ghosh (born 1986)
 Jiban Ghosh (born 1946)
 Shanti Ghoshal (born 1936)
 Yere Goud (born 1971)
 Baloo Gupte

J

 Rongsen Jonathan (born 1986)
 Uday Joshi (born 1944)

K

 Hitesh Kadam (born 1988)
 Hemlata Kala (born 1975)
 Rakesh Kanojia
 Murali Kartik (born 1976)
 Praveen Kashyap (born 1953)
 Habib Khan (born 1937)
 Ranjit Khanwilkar (1960–1988)
 Gaurav Khatri (born 1991)
 Jehangir Khot (1913–1990)
 Syed Kirmani (born 1949)
 Sulakshan Kulkarni (born 1967)
 M. Suresh Kumar (born 1973)
 Budhi Kunderan
 Soumendranath Kundu (born 1942)

L

 Jagdish Lal (1920–1997)

M

 Parag Madkaikar (born 1986)
 Karan Mahajan (born 1997)
 Ranjeet Mali (born 1988)
 Jacob Martin (born 1972)
 Anil Mathur (born 1951)
 Bhaskar Mazumbar (born 1951)
 Madan Mehra (born 1934)
 Vijay Mehra
 Ambikeshwar Mishra (born 1993)
 Amit Mishra (born 1988)
 Sagar Mishra (born 1993)
 Durga Mukherjee (1933–2011)
 Robin Mukherjee (1943–2009)

N

 Vivek Naidu (born 1979)
 Arnab Nandi (born 1987)
 B. B. Nimbalkar (died 2012)

P

 Amit Pagnis (born 1978)
 Akshat Pandey (born 1993)
 Madansingh Parmar (born 1936)
 Dhiraj Parsana (born 1947)
 Asad Ullah Khan Pathan
 Amit Paunikar (born 1988)
 Dattu Phadkar

Q

 Shahid Qureshi (1936–2013)

Ramkesh meena (born 1993)

 Vasant Ranjane
 Balaji Rao (born 1978)
 Bhima Rao (born 1987)
 Manish Rao (born 1990)
 Mahesh Rawat (born 1985)

S

 Rahul Sanghvi (born 1974)
 Rajendranath Sanyal (born 1935)
 Sanjib Sanyal (born 1977)
 Dipankar Sarkar (born 1950)
 Vineet Saxena (born 1980)
 Ashish Sehrawat (born 1995)
 Swapan Sen (born 1951)
 Mohammad Shahid (1948–2014)
 Abhay Sharma (born 1969)
 Karn Sharma (born 1987)
 Sanjeev Sharma (born 1965)
 Vishal Sharma (born 1977)
 Shivakant Shukla (born 1986)
 Baba Sidhaye (1932–2002)
 Anureet Singh (born 1988)
 Ashish Singh (born 1994)
 Harvinder Singh (born 1977)
 Hemant Singh (born 1988)
 Manjeet Singh (born 1991)
 Narinder Singh (born 1954)
 Pappu Singh (born 1993)
 Pratham Singh (born 1992)
 Vivek Singh (born 1993)
 Anant Solkar (born 1951)

 Sevak Bharat

T

 Satender Thakran (born 1993)
 Karan Thakur (born 1992)

U

 Krishnakant Upadhyay (born 1986)

V

 Sunil Valson (born 1958)
 Rajeswar Vats (born 1953)
 Siddharth Verma (born 1980)

Y

 Akash Yadav (born 1993)
 Ashish Yadav (born 1985)
 Jai Prakash Yadav (born 1974)

Z

 Zakaria Zuffri (born 1975)

References

Railways cricketers

cricketers